Choate Rosemary Hall (often known as Choate) is a private, co-educational, college-preparatory boarding school in Wallingford, Connecticut, United States. Choate is currently ranked as the second best boarding school and third best private high school in America. Founded in 1890, it took its present name and began a co-educational system with the 1971 merger of The Choate School for boys and Rosemary Hall for girls. It is part of the Eight Schools Association and the Ten Schools Admissions Organization. Its alumni include many members of the American political elite.

History

Early years 

The schools that would eventually become Choate Rosemary Hall were begun by members of two prominent New England families, the Choates and Atwaters.

Rosemary Hall was founded in 1890 by Mary Atwater Choate at Rosemary Farm in Wallingford, her girlhood home and the summer residence of her and her husband, William Gardner Choate. Mary, an alumna of Miss Porter's School, was the great-granddaughter of Caleb Atwater (1741–1832), a Connecticut merchant magnate who supplied the American forces during the Revolutionary War. In 1775 General George Washington visited the Atwater store in Wallingford en route to assuming command of the Continental Army. On that occasion, Washington took tea with Judge Oliver Stanley at the "Red House" (built 1690–1750), now Squire Stanley House on the Choate campus.

In 1878 Mary Atwater Choate had co-founded a vocational organization for Civil War widows, the New York Exchange for Women's Work, a prototype of many such exchanges across the country (it survived until 2003). In 1889, Mary planned a new institution on the same principle of female self-sufficiency, and she advertised in The New York Times for a headmistress to run a school that would train girls in the "domestic arts." The advertisement was answered by Caroline Ruutz-Rees (1865–1954), a 25-year-old Briton teaching in New Jersey.

On October 3, 1890, the New Haven Morning News reported: "The opening of Rosemary Hall took place at Wallingford yesterday ... at the beautiful Rosemary Farms, which have been the property of Mrs. Choate's family for five generations. ... Rev. Edward Everett Hale addressed the school girls in his inimitable way, at once attractive and helpful. 'Never forget,' said he, 'that it is a great art to do what you do well. If you limp, limp well, and if you dance, dance well'."

The eight arriving girls occupied the original school building, "old Atwater House" (built 1758), located at the northwest corner of Christian and Elm streets, where the new Atwater House now stands. They also used "Atwater homestead" (built 1774, now known as Homestead), which stands at the center of the present-day campus, on the northeast corner of Christian and Elm streets.

Caroline Ruutz-Rees (pronounced "roots-reece," the first syllable rhyming with "foot"), headmistress of Rosemary Hall until 1938, was a figure of extraordinary personality and influence, a militant feminist and suffragist of national prominence. On the Wallingford golf course, she wore bloomers, which shocked the locals, and on buggy rides to Wallingford station, she carried a pistol. She quickly changed Rosemary Hall's mission from "domestic arts" to that of a contemporary boys' school.

The Choate School was founded by William and Mary Choate in 1896. William Gardner Choate (1830–1921), Harvard class of 1852, was U.S. District Judge for the Southern Circuit of New York from 1878 to 1881, and afterward a partner of Shipman, Barlow, Laroque, and Choate. He was a national authority on admiralty, railroad, bankruptcy, and corporation law. Like his younger, more famous brother, he was a prominent club man (Harvard and The Century). That brother was Joseph Hodges Choate, lawyer, a prosecutor of the Tweed Ring, and Ambassador to the Court of St. James's.

William and Mary Choate invited Mark Pitman (1830–1905), their tenant in the aforementioned Red House, to start a boys' school under their sponsorship. Pitman, Bowdoin class of 1859, was 66 years old, a widower, and had been principal of Woolsey School in New Haven, Connecticut, since 1872. He accepted the Choates' offer, not least perhaps because it would employ his unmarried adult daughters, Leila, Elizabeth, and Helen. Six boys entered the new school in fall term 1896, their average age about ten. Four of the six lived in Red House with the Pitmans, the first of many periods when Red House (now Squire Stanley House) has served as a dormitory for the youngest students.

Pitman taught Latin, English, history, and science; Elizabeth taught art, Helen piano, and Leila was a writing teacher and school nurse. Mary Choate's physician brother, Huntington Atwater, taught crafts and was a school doctor. There was no formal relationship with the Choates' other foundation, Rosemary Hall, a hundred yards to the east on Christian Street, but there were coeducational audiences for plays and recitals, and Mary Choate hosted dances at the Homestead.

In 1897, the boys' school erected Choate House across the street from Red House, the first purpose-built institutional building (and John F. Kennedy's dormitory in 1931-2). It contained recitation rooms, an infirmary, a dining room, and housing for fifteen boys. In 1899 Choate House was the venue for the first "Junior Dance", but a year later, the Rosemary girls would depart for a seventy-one-year absence.

The official history of Choate Rosemary Hall, written by Tom Generous, says that the rift between Caroline Ruutz-Rees and Mary Choate, proponents of two very different sorts of feminism, was public knowledge as early as 1896. In that year, the two women did not share the lectern at Prize Day, and local newspapers published "denials" of a rumor that Ruutz-Rees would leave the school. But by 1900, the headmistress and her educational style had acquired influential champions among the students' parents, and two of them, residents of Greenwich, Connecticut, joined forces to effect the removal of the school to their town.

Shipping magnate Nathaniel Witherell donated  of land in the Rock Ridge section of Greenwich. Julian Curtiss gathered a group of investors and established a joint-stock corporation funded through the sale of six-percent bonds. Ruutz-Rees was the chief shareholder. The Greenwich residence of Rosemary Hall began in the fall term 1900 when 57 girl students moved into the Main Building, known as "The School", a U-shaped shingled house on Zaccheus Mead Lane.

In Wallingford, Mark Pitman died on December 3, 1905. Until 1908 Sumner Blakemore was titular headmaster, but the school was effectively the domain of the three Pitman sisters. At the 1908 graduation ceremony, the Japanese Consul General watched his countryman Noyobu Masuda give the valedictory address. Then Judge Choate introduced the man who would assume the headmastership in the fall, George St. John, and his wife, Clara Seymour St. John. She was a Bryn Mawr alumna, member of a well-connected Connecticut family, sister of future (1937–1951) Yale president Charles Seymour, and descendant of Yale president (1740–1766) Thomas Clap.

George Clair St. John (1877–1966), Harvard class of 1902 and aged 31 in the fall of 1908, had grown up on a farm in Hoskins Station, Connecticut. He was an ordained Episcopal priest. He had taught at The Hill School in Pennsylvania and Adirondack-Florida School, and was teaching at Hackley School in Tarrytown, N.Y., when Samuel Dutton of Columbia Teachers College recruited him for the headmastership. St. John "knew, long before I read Mr. Dutton's letter, that I wanted some day to have a school of my own. In my thought about it, Dean Briggs was my first text." This was LeBaron Russell Briggs, dean of men at Harvard when St. John was there and afterward dean of the faculty until 1925. Briggs, St. John wrote, "fathered the whole college", and the St. Johns too would serve in loco parentis.

Their first move to secure parental powers was decisive. In September 1909, as the official history tells it, the St. Johns "signed with the Choates an 'Agreement to Lease and Purchase.' Under its terms, the younger couple rented the school, its property and reputation, for five years at a sum equal to 11 percent of The Choate School's net income per year. ... Less than twenty months later, on May 12, 1911, St. John reported to the trustees that he had purchased the title to the school by acquiring mortgages of roughly $41,000. He resold the title in turn to The Choate School, Incorporated, for $23,000 cash and $38,000 in stock ... For all intents and purposes, The Choate School belonged to George St. John."

In his first quarter-century as headmaster, St. John created much of Choate as it is regarded today. Of the Georgian brick and stone campus, he had built by 1932 Hill House, West Wing, the Gymnasium, Memorial House, the Chapel, the Library, the Winter Exercise Building, and Archbold Infirmary, which was the largest school infirmary in the country. He grew the enrollment from 35 to 505 boys and the faculty from 5 to 64 masters. In the decade following the First World War (classes of 1918 to 1928), Choate sent 412 of its 618 graduates to Yale, Princeton, and Harvard, according to a table published in The Choate News in fall term 1928.

George St. John belonged to the generation of legendary, long-serving headmasters who shaped the New England prep school, chief among whom were Endicott Peabody of Groton School, Frank Boyden of Deerfield Academy, Horace Dutton Taft of Taft School, Frederick Sill of Kent School, Samuel Drury of St. Paul's School, Alfred Stearns of Phillips Academy Andover, Lewis Perry of Phillips Exeter Academy, and George Van Santvoord of Hotchkiss School.

The Rev. George St. John of Choate was succeeded in 1947 by his son, the Rev. Seymour St. John '31 (1912–2006), and the "St. John dynasty" was continued to 1973. Seymour was Yale class of 1935 and was ordained after graduating from Virginia Theological Seminary in 1942. During his time as head, he built as many buildings as his father had built, greatly broadened the curriculum, raised the national profile of the school, and made it more progressive (Eleanor Roosevelt, Norman Thomas, and William Sloane Coffin were regular speakers) and cosmopolitan (Russian, Near Eastern, and Afro-American studies centers were founded, and Russian, Chinese, and Arabic courses were begun). St. John was a longtime advocate of coeducation and initiated the Choate-Rosemary contacts. At his death, headmaster Edward Shanahan told the New York Times, "The merger demanded an enormous expenditure of resources by Choate because the building of a new campus was to occur within the footprints of its property. Seymour was central to the decision to expand those resources."

JFK, the Muckers, and "Ask not" 

In 1931 John F. Kennedy entered Choate as a third form (9th grade) student, following his older brother Joe Jr., who was a star athlete at the school. Jack Kennedy—sickly, underweight, and nicknamed Rat Face by his schoolfellows—spent his first two years at Choate in his brother's shadow, and compensated for it with rebellious behavior that attracted a coterie. He named his group The Muckers Club, which had thirteen members—Kennedy and twelve disciples. Among these was Kennedy's lifelong inseparable friend Kirk LeMoyne "Lem" Billings, who kept an apartment in the White House during JFK's presidency.

As Headmaster of Choate, George St. John's chapel talks included a recurring phrase that was widely remembered by Choate alumni. In 2008, school archivist Judy Donald found the phrase in St. John's notebooks, and in 2011 journalist Chris Matthews published the discovery in his biography of JFK. St. John's phrase (borrowed from Harvard dean LeBaron Briggs) was, "The youth who loves his alma mater will always ask not 'What can she do for me?' but 'What can I do for her?'" Speculation that this was the original of JFK's inaugural address "Ask not" goes back at least as far as a 1966 Time magazine article, and several of JFK's Choate contemporaries noticed the echo in 1961. Kennedy graduated from Choate in 1935. In senior class polling for the yearbook (of which he was business manager), Kennedy was voted Most Likely to Succeed.

Timeline  

 1889: Mary Atwater Choate advertises in New York for a headmistress.
 1890: Foundation of Rosemary Hall; Caroline Ruutz-Rees begins 48 years as headmistress; 8 girls enroll. October 2, opening ceremonies held.
 1891: First election of Optima, or best girl; the honor was bestowed until 1977.
 1892: First publication of The Question Mark, a literary magazine, one of the earliest of its type in an American girls school.
 1893: Spring term, first Shakespeare play performed. Rosemary Hall hosts Mrs. Hazen's School of Pelham Manor, N.Y., in what is regarded as the first interscholastic sports event between girls schools in American history.
 1894: First interscholastic basketball game played against New Haven Normal School.
 1896: Foundation of the Choate School by William Gardner Choate and Mary Atwater Choate; from 1896 to 1908 all annual deficits are paid by Judge Choate. Mark Pitman begins his nine-year tenure. 6 boys enroll. At Rosemary Hall, Frederick Hulseberg is hired to coach the cricket team, thereby becoming the first girls cricket coach in America.
 1897: At the Choate School, the Choate House is constructed. Dramatic Club mounts its first play in the Choate House library. Good Government Club begins, the precursor of student council.
 1897: At Rosemary Hall, first election of The Committee, the student self-governance body; it lasted until 1971.
 1898: At Rosemary, sixth formers are required to pass the Bryn Mawr College entrance exam in order to graduate; the requirement lasted 39 years.
 1899: At Choate, enrollment is 20 boys. Dining room "French Table" begins. May 13, first interscholastic baseball game played against Wallingford High School. December 9, first interscholastic basketball game played against Wallingford High.
 1900: At Choate in March, basketball game against Stearns School played at Company K Armory, with Rosemary Hall girls forming a cheering section. Debates held between two secret societies, the Owls (standing for wisdom) and Helvetians (fidelity and honor). Spring term, first publication of The Brief, the yearbook. Fall term, first interscholastic football season, record of 2–1.
 1900: Rosemary Hall relocates to Greenwich with 57 girls.
 1901: Gymnasium built for $15,000, the gift of Julius Meyerowitz. The Lodge (now Sally Hart Lodge) and Bungalow bought. "Ice polo", the precursor of hockey, plays four-game season.
 1902: 40 boys. Atwater House, formerly occupied by Rosemary Hall, becomes the main building. The Cabin, a "science museum" and workshop, is donated by Judge Choate. Boys install wiring in Choate House for room-to-room telephoning. First "Big Dance", eventually to become Festivities.
 1904: Library space is added to Atwater House. Charles Vezin Jr, future pole-vault world record-holder, is on the track team.
 1905: December 3, headmaster Mark Pitman dies.
 1907: Publication of The Choate Chronicle, a newspaper adjunct to The Brief; it was precursor to The Choate News.
 1908: Fall term, George St. John begins 39 years as headmaster; he lives in Curtis House (now Sally Hart Lodge), which will remain the official headmaster's residence until 1997. 35 boys, 5 masters. The school occupies . Choate Orchestra begins. The Choate Chronicle is renamed The Choate News.

 1909: First Seal Prize awarded to outstanding sixth former (senior); since 1982 also awarded to sixth form girl.
 1911: May 12, St. John "buys" the school for $23,000 cash and $38,000 in stock. May 30, dedication of Hill House; it cost $40,000, mainly the gift of St. John's Harvard friend Arthur Hoe. John Dos Passos graduates. Fall term, 103 boys, 13 masters.
 1912: 124 boys, 16 masters. The glee club begins.
 1913: St. Andrew's Society founded; it operates a camp for underprivileged boys from New York, staffed by Choate boys; it lasted until 1965. Boathouse on Community Lake and two shells are given by Nathaniel W. Bishop.
 1914: February 4, first meal served in newly completed West Wing dining hall. Fall term, 131 boys, 17 masters.
 1915: 142 boys enroll. First publication of The Choate Literary Magazine. Crew begins; tennis club begins.
 1916: March 16, Meyerowitz Gymnasium destroyed by fire. Golf club begins. Fall term, 177 boys, 23 masters. The Gables is bought.
 1917: Spring term, the new Gymnasium (now Student Activities Center) is completed. Orchard House and Further Cottage are bought. Fall term, 200 boys, 25 masters.
 1918: Battalion Companies A, B, C, D organized. Adlai Stevenson graduates.
 1919: Chester Bowles graduates. Darling House bought. Fall term, 237 boys, 28 masters.
 1920: The Parsonage, East Cottage, and Ayres, Church, and Long Houses are bought; East Cottage will be John F. Kennedy's fourth form residence. Fall term, 253 boys, 32 masters. The choir begins.
 1921: 271 boys, 34 masters. Fall term, Memorial House is completed; there were 280 donors, including Andrew Mellon P'25, who gave $15,000. "Admiral" Austin Meeks '16 arrives to coach crew to regional dominance in the 1920s and 1930s; by 1933 Choate rows eight shells.
 1922: 299 boys, 38 masters. First Deerfield Day; Choate football wins 28–6.
 1923: 322 boys, 40 masters. Brown-Massie House bought.
 1924: 339 boys, 43 masters. Creation of "The Choate School Chapel Foundation"; it attracts 624 donors. Completion of the Chapel; designed by Ralph Adams Cram and constructed by Choate staff; Andrew Mellon's donation was $25,000. Choate Farm is bought and the school dairy built.
 1925: Paul Mellon graduates. Woodhouse is bought. 361 boys, 45 masters.
 1926: Spring term, Andrew Mellon Library is completed; Mellon gave $150,000 of its $200,000 cost. Fall term, 401 boys, 50 masters.
 1927: 426 boys, 57 masters. The Deaconage bought.
 1928: 452 boys, 57 masters. John Ed Wilfong starts the nursery. Completion of John D. Archbold Infirmary.
 1929: Robert Fitzgerald graduates. Fall term, 497 boys, 62 masters. The Hall is built. Foundation name changed to "The Choate School Chapel and Library Foundation"; it owns the Chapel, Library, Memorial House, Archbold, and the Hall.
 1930: Alan Lomax graduates. Mahlon Thatcher Track and Fields built, the gift of Mr. and Mrs. Mahlon Thatcher in memory of their son Mahlon Jr, a fourth former who had died in a riding accident. Fall term, 509 boys, 64 masters. Soccer team begins. First appearance of the band at a football game.
 1931: 505 boys, 64 masters. Munson House bought. Baseball begins a six-season record of 57–6.
 1932: January, Joseph P. Kennedy P'35 arranges the first showing of a movie. Winter Exercise Building (now Johnson Athletic Center) is built entirely by Choate staff and cost $275,000, one-third of which was given by Mr. and Mrs. Mahlon Thatcher; the Winter Ex was the final project of building supervisor Henry Raymond Stone, who died in 1931. The Headmaster, an insatiable Savoyard, commands the first of yearly Gilbert and Sullivan productions (The Mikado) that continue to his retirement year 1947 (Patience).
 1933: 475 boys, 59 masters. Homestead and Red Cottage bought, Homestead from Hunt Atwater '03, nephew of Mary Atwater Choate.
 1934: 459 boys, 58 masters. Edsall House bought.
 1935: John F. Kennedy graduates. 466 boys, 57 masters. 1690 House bought. January 12–13, Gertrude Stein visits campus and her lecture is published in The Choate Literary Magazine.
 1936: Alan Jay Lerner and Avery Dulles graduate. Fall term, 490 boys, 62 masters. Chapel House and New Old South are bought, the gift of Clinton P. Knight, Jr. Dudley Fitts and his former student Robert Fitzgerald '29 publish translations of Alcestis of Euripides (1936) and Antigone of Sophocles (1939).
 1937: 501 boys, 64 masters. Alumni Boathouse built; 400 donors. The Choate School, Incorporated, transfers its property to the Foundation. Combination House is created from the joining of the relocated Brown and Middle cottages.

 1938: Paul Mellon Science Hall (now Mellon Humanities Center) is built, the gift of Paul Mellon '25. Red House (now Squire Stanley) bought from the Atwater family. "The Golden Blues" swing band begins and will last 30 years.
 1939: April, first issue of The Choate Alumni Bulletin is published; Dan D. Coyle '34 is editor.
 1940: Fathers Association begins.
 1941: Mothers Association begins.
 1943: Alumni Fund council begins. March, Boston Braves move into campus residence to use the Winter Ex for spring training; they return in March 1944.
 1944: Fiftieth Anniversary Campaign for endowment begins.
 1945: The Maiyeros a cappella group begun by music master Duncan Phyfe '38.
 1946: Edward Albee graduates; his first published play, Schism, appears in the Commencement issue of The Choate Literary Magazine. Dedication of Wilken Field in memory of Ray Theodore "Ted" Wilken '40. September 27–29, celebration of Choate's Fiftieth Anniversary, among the speakers were John F. Kennedy '35, the presidents of Yale (St. John's brother-in-law), Princeton, and Williams, and the heads of Andover, Deerfield, Groton, St. Paul's, Hotchkiss, Lawrenceville, Taft, Loomis, Westminster, and Milton.
 1947: 533 boys. Trustees elect Seymour St. John '31 headmaster; he is installed June 11 and begins his 26-year tenure. Richard R. Higgins succeeds George St. John as president of the Foundation. Logan Munroe House is built, the gift of Charles A. Munroe P'33 in memory of his son.
 1948: 550 boys. Nichols House is built, the gift of Charles Walter Nichols, Jr. '29, and named in memory of his father, trustee 1947–57.
 1950: First Project Day, brought on by a storm that downed trees; now called Community Day.
 1952: Adlai Stevenson '18 is the Democratic Presidential nominee, and again in 1956.
 1953: December 5, dedication of the outdoor Courtenay Hemenway Rink.
 1957: Wheeler House is bought; named for Frank Wheeler, teacher and director of studies 1916–52. Fall term, Johannes van Straalen begins teaching Russian a month before the launch of Sputnik 1. October, dedication of George and Clara St. John Hall; it cost $562,000.
 1959: Forty Years at School by headmaster emeritus George St. John is published by Henry Holt and Company.

 1960: April 17, the History Club is addressed by Nobel Peace Prize laureate Ralph Bunche, whose son Ralph Jr. '61 is the school's first African-American student. Pitman, Atwater, and Mead houses are built, the latter named for George Jackson Mead, class of 1911, trustee 1947–57. In November, John Kennedy '35 is elected President; in a straw poll only 18 percent of students vote for him.
 1961: January 20, Kennedy takes office; his inaugural address "Ask not" phrase is sometimes said to derive from George St. John's "Ask not what your school can do for you; ask what you can do for your school."
 1962: May 5, dedication of new wing of Library, with Robert Frost reading his Kennedy inaugural poem, "The Gift Outright." Spencer House (originally '62 House) is built; in 1982 it will be renamed in memory of James Spencer, chemistry and physics teacher 1962–82.
 1963: Michael Douglas graduates. Quantrell House is built; named in memory of Ernest E. Quantrell P'42, trustee 1942–61.
 1964: In the summer, Alberto "Tico" Carrero '66 wins the U.S. under-16 tennis championship; his varsity record in three years is 36–0.
 1965: John Dos Passos '11 attends 50th anniversary celebration of The Lit. Fall term, sixth formers in the history class of Jack McCune (future headmaster of St. Alban's) are the guests of Secretary of State Dean Rusk in his office; they challenge him on the Vietnam War. McCook House is completed, named for Anson T. McCook, trustee 1911–62; the dormitory and its twin, Clinton Knight House, were designed by architect Frank Winder '39.
 1966: January, headmaster emeritus George St. John dies, aged 88. Spring term, Ralph Metcalfe, Jr. '66, son of the Olympic gold-medalist and Illinois Congressman, is the top high school hammer thrower in the country. Clinton Knight House is completed, named for Clinton P. Knight Jr. '12, trustee 1938–56. Fall term, Paul Mellon '25 offers $1.5 million to build a facility for theater, music, and visual arts; his vision would be realized for $5 million in 1972.
 1967: Winter term, dedication of Remsen Arena, the gift of the family of William C. S. Remsen '39. Varsity hockey is 17–0. Steele Hall is built, named for George Steele. The Chapel is enlarged by extension to the south. The Hall is enlarged by widening to the south. Baseball, coached by Tom Yankus '52, begins an eight-season league record of 54–2. Afro-American Union is formed. Fall term, in Greenwich, Connecticut, Rosemary Hall (RH) headmistress Alice McBee urges trustees of that school to consider "official affiliation" with a boys school, in light of declining enrollment and financial difficulty.

 1968: In January, Duke Ellington Orchestra plays in the Chapel. January 8, headmaster St. John hosts a private meeting in Wallingford with RH Board chair Charles Stetson, and the feasibility of relocating RH is discussed. January 26, Choate trustees vote to allow continuing discussions with RH. June, the CS and RH boards make a formal agreement, with the understanding that RH would relocate. September 24, St. John and McBee hold a press conference in St. John Hall and issue a press release dated September 26 which states that "a brand new school would be built for Rosemary Hall on Choate Land, and the combined institutions would provide 'coordinate' secondary education starting in September 1971."
 1969: Spring term, in response to student unrest St. John appoints English master Malcolm Manson '57 to run "Metanoia", a six-week lecture program that replaces Thursday classes; Margaret Mead and Alvin Toffler are the first two speakers. First African-American master, Charles O. Todman Jr., is appointed to teach history and start the Afro-American Studies Center. Dress code no longer requires jacket and tie in the classroom. In November St. John allows about 50 students to attend the peace march in Washington, D.C.
 1969: January, architect James Polshek is selected to design the Wallingford RH campus; his budget will eventually be $6.4 million. On Prize Day, Seymour St. John is the graduation speaker in Greenwich.
 1970: Spring term, 20 RH sixth formers have an advance guard residence on the CS campus; they live in Nichols House; Meg Colgate '70 is made interim editor of The Choate News. The book A World of Our Own by Peter Prescott '53, son of Orville Prescott of the New York Times, examines the political turmoil in the school year 1967–68. Fall term, chapel attendance is no longer compulsory. Zurn Organ is installed in the Chapel, given in memory of John Henry Zurn '43.
 1971: 568 boys. Elizabeth Winslow Loomis begins two years as RH headmistress; she had been head of upper school at The Lenox School (now Birch Wathen Lenox School) in Manhattan and a former RH teacher and dean. June 3, the last Prize Day in Greenwich, Choate head Seymour St. John is the graduation speaker. The Greenwich campus is bought by Daycroft School, which moves from its own Greenwich campus on Rock Ridge Road. August, the last two Wallingford campus buildings, Bronfman Library and Macquire Gymnasium, are completed. The school and 223 girls relocate.
 1972: May 12–14, dedication of Paul Mellon Arts Center ("PMAC"), the gift entire of Paul Mellon '25; it cost more than $5 million; three-day celebration includes May 12 dedication speech by Edward Albee '46, a production of his Zoo Story, performances by the Boston Pops and Victor Borge, and official May 13 dedication of the RH campus. Fall term, all-school sit-down meals end. Fall term, an early and groundbreaking experiment in independent study begins in Room 501 of the PMAC, with approval of Seymour St. John at the urging of Philip Ventre, as a group of rock musicians composes and performs originals to student audiences as far north as Hebron Academy in Maine.

 1973: Spring term, RH yearbook The Answer Book is merged into The Brief. July 1, Seymour St. John resigns as headmaster. Wallingford Symphony Orchestra is formed by Philip Ventre, with the PMAC as its home. Lewis House is bought, named for Robert E. Lewis, teacher 1917–47. Fall term, CS and RH adopt uniform grading system. October 4, Charles F. Dey is installed as first "president and principal of The Choate School and Rosemary Hall." Dey was formerly an associate dean at Dartmouth and had taught history at Andover. He appoints RH academic dean and classics teacher Joanne Sullivan as dean and head of RH, and former St. Paul's School teacher Richard Aiken as dean and head of CS.
 1974: June, the two boards of trustees are merged, with Elizabeth Hyde Brownell '21 as chair. RH newspaper The Wild Boar is merged into The Choate News. The students Creative Arts Committee is formed; an arts credit is added to graduation requirements.
 1976: Jamie Lee Curtis graduates. February 18, fire damages the north section of the Winter Ex. December 1, rebuilt Winter Ex opens and is named for Worthington Johnson '32, who led fundraising that would secure $4 million in two years. Winter term, squash and riflery become coed sports.
 1977: May, first joint Prize Day. Fall term, first joint registration, orientation, and Convocation. CS Student Council and RH Committee unofficially merge. Football, coached by Doug James, begins a five-season record of 32–7–1. Bobette Reed is first African-American admissions officer. Adlai E. Stevenson '18 Lecture Series is inaugurated by Allard Lowenstein. 
 1978: May 28, the first joint graduation on Archbold Lawn, with single diploma of "Choate Rosemary Hall." Fall term, football beats Deerfield 9–3 on a 99-yard, two-play drive, and Bob Galvin's "Miracle Catch" with no time left on the clock.
 1979: March, John Joseph Activities Center opens in the made-over Gymnasium, the gift of F. Morgan and Barbara Olin Taylor. Headmistress emeritus Eugenia Baker Jessup dies. Alumni Weekend, Larry Hart Pool opens as a coed facility, the gift of Larry Hart '32. November 1–4, The Crucible is performed and its author Arthur Miller lectures on McCarthyism.
 1980: Spring term, the Last Hurrah begins with the merger of Festivities and The Mid. The cross is removed from the Chapel.
 1981: Official merger of the student governments as CRH Student Council. Spring term, Joanne Sullivan heads an ad hoc committee that recommends increased emphasis on lab sciences and computer science, and curriculum mandates that might include economics, psychology, philosophy, religious studies, and the arts. CRH adopts a new combined seal, melding Choate (3 swords) and RH (Wild Boar) imagery, separated diagonally.
 1982: 76 students of color, more than twice as many as the year before. Faculty approves new curriculum based on 1981 Sullivan committee recommendations. Richardson House is bought; given its present name in 1998 for Elfrida Richardson, RH organist and choirmistress 1916–59.

 1984: April, U.S. Customs agents at Kennedy Airport in New York, alerted by the school, apprehend a student returning from Venezuela with 340 grams of cocaine bought with schoolmates' money; 14 students are expelled, and the TV program 60 Minutes runs a segment on the incident. Summer, the Connecticut Scholars program begins; its first session brings 52 public school students to campus for a five-week science and math course. Spears Endowment for Spiritual and Moral Education is founded, named for William G. Spears '56, Board chair 1985–90 and head of capital campaign Endowment Plus, which raised $26 million.
 1985: Paul Giamatti graduates. Sylvester Boathouse built on Lake Quonnipaug, named for Benjamin F. Sylvester, Jr., longtime crew coach and history teacher. Office of Public-Private Collaboration is formed for community outreach. Centennial Committee is created, with chairs Elizabeth Hyde Brownell '21 and C. Walter Nichols '55.
 1986: In the Chapel "The Creation" altar tapestry is hung, the gift of RH class of 1921, woven by Sylvia Heyden. 
 1987: Squire Stanley is moved  back from Christian Street to help reveal the west facade of Mellon Science Hall (now Mellon Humanities Center). 
 1988: January, agreement signed with Russia's Moscow School #18 for an annual four-week exchange of five students and one leader; Russian group arrives in April, Choate group to Moscow in September. Summer, the Connecticut Scholars program, now with 105 students, adds humanities courses to its previously science and math curriculum. Pierce House is named for Charles Pierce, admissions director and teacher 1945–77. Walsh House is named for Donald D. Walsh, teacher 1928–59.

 1989: In anticipation of the centennial anniversary, CRH adopts new seal, motto ("Vetus Tamen Iuvenesco") and song, proposed and created by former RH faculty, with much derision from 6th form students; the changes would be reversed in 1996.
 1990: May, Centennial Year concludes with Reunion Weekend and Centennial Gala in the PMAC, emceed by Elliott Gould P'89. December 19, Edward Shanahan is introduced at an all-school assembly in the PMAC.
 1991: September 8, Shanahan is ceremonially invested as president and headmaster. Endowment draw is reduced to 5.5 percent. 
 1992: September, inauguration of Matriculation Ceremony, in which "values of Choate" pledge cards are signed. 
 1993: October, trustees approve long range plan for curriculum change, residential life improvement, and other capital plant renewal.
 1994: January, trustees vote to reduce enrollment from 1025 to 825 over a five-year period; faculty and staff reduction through attrition would be less severe.
 1995: April 20, at Guggenheim Museum in New York is launched "A Shared Commitment", a capital campaign for $100 million, 85 percent of which would go to endowment; campaign chairs are Christopher Hutchins '56 and Edwin A. Goodman '58; Hutchins's gift of $20 million was, at the time, the largest unrestricted gift ever received by a secondary school; Paul Mellon '25 gave $10 million. October, dedication of Hunt Tennis Center, the gift of Tod Hunt '40. Albert Schweitzer Institute for the Humanities, founded 1973, begins four years residence at Choate; it would bring Nobel laureates Mikhail Gorbachev, Desmond Tutu, and Betty Williams to campus.

 1996: In response to alumni complaints and trademark issues, Shanahan restores the 1981-1988 CRH seal and the pre-1931 Choate song and motto ("Fidelitas et Integritas"), while adopting RH's "Wild Boar" mascot for boys and girls athletic teams.
 1997: Porter House becomes the headmaster's residence; it was named for George F. Porter, teacher and sometime baseball coach 1925–67. Endowment of the Icahn Scholars Program, the gift of Gail and Carl C. Icahn P'97, '00, supported by the Icahn Charitable Foundation and the Foundation for a Greater Opportunity. Choate Rosemary Hall: A History of the School by Tom Generous and Charles T. Wilson is published.
 1998: Chapel is rededicated and named for headmaster emeritus Seymour St. John.
 2001: Paul Mellon Science Center is renamed for Carl C. Icahn P'97, '00, following his $5 million gift. Endowment of the Charles Krause '51 Fellow in Rhetoric, the gift of Krause.
 2002: North wing of Johnson Athletic Center is built. Library is renovated, the gift of Christopher Hutchins '56. Curtis House is renovated and becomes Sally Hart Lodge, the school guest house, gift of Larry Hart '32.
 2005: Edward Albee '46 receives a Special Tony Award for Lifetime Achievement.
 2006: February, at the Winter Olympics in Turin the U.S. women's hockey team has three alumnae, Angela Ruggiero '98, Kim Insalaco '99, and Julie Chu '01. April, representatives of the heretofore informal Eight Schools Association meet at Lawrenceville to discuss a more formal arrangement, including a literary magazine, sports league, and student and faculty conferences; Shanahan of Choate is elected president of the Association (he is succeeded in 2009 by Elizabeth Duffy of Lawrenceville). Walton Family Foundation gives $11.7 million to endow the Gakio-Walton Scholars Program, a memorial to Wilson Gakio, classmate of Benjamin S. Walton '92; the program provides scholarships to students from specific regions of Africa, India, the Middle East and the United States. Remsen Arena is renovated. November, Headmaster emeritus Seymour St. John dies, aged 94. November, a capital campaign called "An Opportunity to Lead" is launched to raise $200 million, with $100 million in gifts and pledges secured during the silent phase from July 2004.

 2007: Alumni Association begins CRH Regional Clubs effort, with Henry McNulty '65 as chair; inaugural clubs established in Boston and Washington. May 19, dedication of the Bruce '45 and Lueza Gelb Track, named for its donors. Reunion Weekend, 100th birthday of The News celebrated with events featuring alumni journalists. August, the northeast campus is turned into a Disney film set for College Road Trip, starring Martin Lawrence and Raven-Symoné. October, a Royal Bank of Scotland commercial is filmed in the Chapel, with 70 students used as extras. Five houses are renamed following gifts from the Mosbacher and Sophonpanich families: New Old South becomes Mosbacher, Fox becomes Chatri, Backes becomes Jessup, Wheeler becomes Lowndes, and 411 North Main becomes McBee – the last three named for RH headmistresses who were also the namesakes of the three temporary RH dorms built in 1973. Fall term, Arabic courses are again offered after a 30-year hiatus.
 2008: February 11, Republican strategist Karl Rove spends a day on campus; originally invited as commencement speaker, the venue was changed following objections from students, faculty, parents, and alumni. Fall term, South House and Tenney House open; on November 5 the latter is dedicated to Rebecca Tenney Agnew '27, who bequeathed $6 million of the $23-million project. Dedication of Senior Spot bench and patio, the $157,000-gift of the class of 2008, designed by architects Anil Khachane '96 and Mai Wu '87.
 2009: May 19, Choate wins Fed Challenge national high school championship (team included Suril Kantaria, Dan Hartsoe, Nikhith Naidu, Ali Cooper Ponte and Adi Rajagopalan). Fall term, the Town Council rejects the school's offer of either $260,000 or the deed to the site of its old boathouse in exchange for closing a half-mile section of Old Durham Road in the Environmental Center acreage; planning for the center moves forward regardless. A Muslim chaplain is added to the campus ministry. Renovation of St. John Hall. October 17, at St. Bede's Chapel in Greenwich the centennial of the Chapel was celebrated by Rosemarians past and present, with the Whimawehs singing traditional RH songs; Rosemary Hall Alumnae Club is established. CRH clubs are launched in New York and London, joining existing clubs in Beijing, Hong Kong, Seoul, Bangkok, Los Angeles, San Francisco, Boston, and Washington, D.C.

 2010: January 29, trustees approve plans for the Environmental Center, to be built with a $20 million gift from Herbert V. Kohler, Jr. '57. February 2, Edward Shanahan tells an all-school assembly that he will resign as headmaster after the 2010–11 school year; on November 5, the trustees appointed Dr. Alex Curtis as his replacement. February, at the Winter Olympics in Vancouver the silver-medal U.S. women's hockey team has three alumnae, Angela Ruggiero '98, Julie Chu '01, and Hilary Knight '07. The Headmaster reports that, during the international financial crisis, "Choate's endowment declined only 15 percent at a time when some of our peer schools were impacted almost twice as much." March, Geoffrey S. Fletcher '88 wins the Oscar for best adapted screenplay. Spring and summer, a multi-sport artificial-turf field is constructed behind the Johnson Athletic Center; it is dedicated at the October 9 football game against Andover.
 2011: April 1, groundbreaking ceremony for the Kohler Environmental Center, designed by Robert A.M. Stern, dean of the Yale School of Architecture; the Center, to be completed in summer 2012, will include a residential facility for 3 faculty and up to 20 students. April 13–15, Choate hosts the annual meeting of the Eight Schools Association (ESA), with 8 school heads, 16 trustees, and ESA executive director Robert "Skip" Mattoon attending. April 29, the school announces that it exceeded its $200 million capital campaign goal, collecting $215 million in gifts and pledges. July 1, Dr. Alex Curtis succeeded Edward Shanahan as headmaster.
 2012: Spring term, announcement of the construction of a $17 million facility for applied math, computer science, and robotics, to be designed by César Pelli's architecture firm Pelli Clarke Pelli. Fall term, all students and faculty are required to own an iPad as full curriculum integration of the tablet commences.
 2013: October 11, groundbreaking ceremony for Lanphier Center, the computer science building; it is sited on Science Center Pond across from the Icahn Center and is scheduled for March 2015 completion. October 18, dedication of Phoebe House, the headmaster's residence, the gift of William '49 and Frances Little.
 2014: February, Choate has three alumnae compete at the Winter Olympics in Sochi. Phoebe Stanz '13 wins a bronze medal with the Switzerland women's hockey team. Julie Chu '01 and Hilary Knight '07 win a Silver medal with the U.S. women's hockey team. Chu, a four-time Olympian, was chosen by her fellow Team USA members to be the flag bearer at the Closing Ceremony. Chu earned three silver medals (2002, 2010, 2014) and a bronze medal (2006). She was the most veteran member of the women’s hockey team and tied as the second most decorated U.S. female in Olympic Winter Games history.
 2018: February, Choate alumnae Hilary Knight '07 wins a gold medal with the U.S. women's hockey team at the Winter Olympics in Pyeongchang.

Sexual abuse scandal 
In 2017, it acknowledged a decades-long sex abuse scandal, with multiple victims being subjected to abuse from faculty members.

Academics 
Choate's curriculum includes elective and interdisciplinary courses, from astronomy and architecture to printmaking and post-modernism to digital video and development economics. There are more than 300 courses in the curriculum, which has requirements in community service and in contemporary global studies. All disciplines except English have honors courses. As of 2017, Choate no longer offers AP (Advanced Placement) courses.

The Choate signature programs include the Advanced Robotics Program, Arabic and Middle Eastern Studies, Arts Concentration, Capstone, Environmental Immersion Program, JFK Program in Government and Public Service, Science Research Program, and the Global Education Program.

The two-year intensive Science Research Program includes mentored laboratory work during the summer at universities in the United States and abroad. The Capstone Program allows sixth form (senior) students to explore an area of the curriculum in depth. Working under a faculty adviser, students take at least five courses that focus on a curricular theme, culminating in a substantial final project. During the college application process, Choate's College Counseling Office highlights Capstone Project participation in letters of recommendation.

The performing and visual arts are supported by the resources of the Paul Mellon Arts Center. Among extracurricular arts clubs are five a cappella groups; step dance, slam poetry, hip hop, and rap groups; improv, musical theater, and instrumental ensembles of all sizes; photography and film-making clubs; and supporting publications for the arts, fashion, and culture. The Arts Concentration Program provides students with individually tailored instruction and class scheduling.

The Senior Project Program provides on- or off-campus internships in academic research, visual art, and the performing arts. Other specialized programs include American Studies, creative writing, economics, FBLA, mathematics, philosophy, psychology, religion, debate, and the Fed Challenge. The 2011–12 academic year saw the introduction of an Arabic and Middle Eastern Studies Program (AMES). Choate's Office of Global Studies supports study-abroad and other international initiatives. One-third of Choate students participate in programs in China, France, Japan, Spain, and Jordan.

The Kohler Environmental Center, designed by Robert A.M. Stern Architects, opened in 2012 and is located on a 268-acre site in the northeast quadrant of the campus. It has been described as "the first teaching, research and residential environmental center in U.S. secondary education." It can house up to 20 students and two faculty members and supports the curricular Environmental Immersion Program.

In February 2015 the school opened the Lanphier Center for Mathematics and Computer Science, a $17 million, 35,000-square foot campus hub for information technology, applied mathematics, and robotics. The center, designed by architect César Pelli's firm Pelli Clarke Pelli, contains laboratories, classrooms, a lecture hall, and common spaces. It composes a U-shaped courtyard centering on a giant weeping beech tree, and is linked by a footbridge spanning Science Center Pond to the Icahn Center for Science.

Choate's Fed Challenge team was the 2009 national champion and has won the New England District Championship in 12 of the past 13 years. In the 2012 American Mathematics Competitions (AMC) 12-A, Choate's team finished first in the nation, with the highest combined score of all 2631 participating schools.

The Choate chamber orchestra performed at the White House in December 2009 and the school's symphony orchestra toured Europe in 2010 and 2011, giving concerts in ten countries. The festival and chamber choruses performed at St. Patrick's Day mass at St. Peter's Basilica in Rome in 2011. The Maiyeros, an a cappella group, performed at Westminster Abbey in 2008. Choate orchestras and choral groups toured East Asia in 2000, 2005, 2007, and 2014. The June 2014 tour comprised concerts in Seoul, Hong Kong, and Macau, at the Great Wall at Ju Yong Guan, and in ensemble with the Concert Band of Beijing Children's Palace. Choate orchestras have also performed at Lincoln Center in New York, Carnegie Hall, and the Guggenheim Museum. The school's student-operated radio station, WWEB, was FCC-licensed and founded in 1969.

In 2012 Choate became the first among its peer preparatory schools to require that all faculty and students own an iPad. The fall term that year saw the beginning of full integration of the tablet's capabilities into the syllabus. Choate's director of academic technology discussed Choate's iPad program in an August 2012 article in US News.

Statistical profile 

Choate enrolls 846 students, has 120.4 full-time equivalent teaching staff, and a student-teacher ratio of 7.0 for the 2015-2016 school year.

Financial aid totaling more than $10 million was awarded to 32 percent of the student body, the average award being $38,000 for boarders and $26,000 for day students.

In the fiscal year ending June 2014 Choate's endowment was $356.7 million. Among member institutions of the Eight Schools Association Choate led in gifts from parents, with $2.1 million. Total gifts received in that fiscal year were $28.9 million. In November 2006 the school inaugurated a capital campaign with a target of $200 million and by the campaign's close in 2011 gifts and pledges of $220 million had been secured.

Protestant, Catholic, Jewish, and Muslim chaplains serve Choate's campus ministry. Services include Christian fellowship, Protestant evening services, Roman Catholic Mass, Buddhist meditation, Hillel, Spiritual Alternatives, Reflections Program, and other student worship groups.

The school fields 81 interscholastic athletic teams in 32 sports. Choate's historical archrival in athletic competition is Deerfield Academy. The final weekend of the fall season is Deerfield Day (called Choate Day at Deerfield), when the two schools compete in every sport.

On July 1, 2011, Alex Curtis succeeded Edward Shanahan as headmaster of Choate. Shanahan had served as head for twenty years from 1991, when he arrived from Dartmouth College. Curtis was selected by unanimous vote of the Choate board on November 4, 2010. Before Choate, Curtis was headmaster of Morristown-Beard School in New Jersey for seven years.

Buildings and facilities 

The  campus contains 121 buildings in a variety of architectural styles. Georgian Revival predominates (examples by famed traditionalist architect Ralph Adams Cram and by Polhemus & Coffin), but there are also eighteenth- and nineteenth-century houses and dramatic modernist structures (examples by I.M. Pei and by James Polshek).

Principal buildings are in Georgian red brick, often with classical porticoes that were, by design, the unifying architectural feature of the early building phase. Of this type are, in chronological order:
 Hill House: Built 1911, designed by Francis Waterman; administration offices, with dormitory above.
 West Wing: Built 1914; adjoining Hill House, a dining hall, with dormitory above.
 Former Student Activities Center (formerly Gymnasium): Built 1917 as a gym, renovated 1979; currently unused, with a connector to the Larry Hart Pool.
 Memorial House: Built 1921; dormitory on the northwest campus, designed to mirror Hill House on the southwest campus.
 Seymour St. John Chapel (formerly St. Andrew's Chapel): Built 1924, designed by Ralph Adams Cram; recently the filming location for commercials of the Royal Bank of Scotland.
 Andrew Mellon Library: Built 1925, designed by Edward Mellon; given by U.S. Treasury Secretary Andrew Mellon P'25; Library special collections include correspondence and memorabilia of John F. Kennedy '35, Adlai Stevenson '18, Edward Albee '46, Caresse Crosby 1910 and other alumni, the Haffenreffer Collection of early American documents and autographs, and collections related to Thomas Hardy and other writers.
 Archbold: Built 1928, designed by Ralph Adams Cram; its scale on the northeast campus mirrors those of Hill House and Memorial House on the west campus; formerly the largest school infirmary in the country, it now houses the visitor center and admissions office, with dormitory above.
 Hall: Built 1929; adjoining West Wing, a cavernous dining hall, with dormitory above.
 Paul Mellon Humanities Center (formerly Paul Mellon Science Hall): Built 1938, designed by Charles Fuller; houses the digital video lab and the departments of English, History, Philosophy, Religion, and Social Sciences.
 Logan Munroe House: Built 1947; dormitory forming an ensemble with Memorial House, Nichols House, and Pitman House, linked by "Mem Circle" on the northwest campus.
 Nichols House: Built 1948, designed by Polhemus & Coffin; dormitory.
 George and Clara St. John Hall: Built 1957; departments of Mathematics and Computer Science, demolished 2015.
 Pitman House: Built 1960; dormitory.
 Library new wing: Built 1963; dedication poem read by Robert Frost.
 Steele Hall: Built 1967; departments of foreign languages.
 Tenney House and Bernhard House: Built 2008, designed by Centerbrook Architects & Planners; it follows the residential college model, the houses flank a courtyard and have a connector archway.
 St. John Hall: Built 2016, current student center, houses Choate Store, Tuck Shop, video game room, pool and ping pong tables, study rooms, newsroom, lockers for day students.
 Ann and George Colony Hall: Built 2019; serves as a venue for community and the Arts, complement to the Paul Mellon Arts Center.

The I. M. Pei-designed buildings on campus are:
 Paul Mellon Arts Center ("PMAC"): Built 1972, the gift of Paul Mellon; it was prototype for the Pei-designed East Building of the National Gallery of Art in Washington, which was also a Paul Mellon benefaction; with a 775-seat proscenium theater designed by George Izenour, a black box theater, a recital hall, film studio, exhibition galleries, fine arts studios, music practice rooms, associated dressing rooms, and classrooms; the PMAC is also the home of the Wallingford Symphony Orchestra and a frequent venue for touring companies.
 Icahn Center for Science (formerly Paul Mellon Science Center): Built 1989, the gift of Paul Mellon, renamed in 2001 following a gift from Carl C. Icahn; with 22 classrooms, laboratories, conservatory, and auditorium; departments of Physics, Chemistry, and Biology.

Other large-scale buildings and athletic facilities include:
 Kohler Environmental Center: Built 2012, designed by Robert A.M. Stern Architects; described as "the first teaching, research and residential environmental center in U.S. secondary education." In December 2019, the Kohler Center earned the International Living Future Institute's Net Zero Energy Building (NZEB) Certification, the largest certified project in New England
 Lanphier Center: Built 2013-15, designed by César Pelli's firm Pelli Clarke Pelli; in large part the gift of Cameron and Edward Lanphier '74; a 35,000-square foot center for applied mathematics, robotics, and information technology; its U-shape forms a courtyard centering on a giant weeping beech tree; a footbridge spanning Science Center Pond connects the Lanphier Center to the Icahn Center for Science. The building houses study rooms, a café, robotics lab, design lab, and math classrooms.
 The Rosemary Hall campus: Built 1971, designed by James Polshek; a complex on the heights of the northeast campus comprising, among other buildings, Bronfman, originally a library, now the Learning Community Day Care Center; Macquire Gymnasium; and Brownell, a former classroom building which now houses the offices of Alumni Relations, Development, and Information Technology. The girls dormitories were removed in the early 2000s.
 Sally Hart Lodge and Alumni Center: Built 1850; the alumni center, guest house, and "hotel" of the school.
 Pratt Health Center: The infirmary, staffed by 24-hour duty nurses and a pediatrician resident on campus; with the offices of Counseling and Community Service. After the Hill House fire, students were housed here as well. 
 Clinton Knight House and McCook House: Built 1966, designed by Frank Winder '39; twin white-brick dormitories, each forming a quadrangle with central skylight atrium.
 Worthington Johnson Athletic Center: Built 1932, designed by Lewis Augustus Coffin; north wing added in 2002, designed by Herbert Newman and Partners; originally called the Winter Exercise Building ("Winter Ex") and renamed in 1976; an enormous building whose central room was used by the Boston Braves in 1943 and 1944 as their spring training infield; the WJAC contains two basketball courts, international squash courts, wrestling room, volleyball courts, suspended indoor track, ergometric room for crew, fitness and training rooms, and dance and aerobics studios.
 Remsen Arena: Built 1967, renovated 2006; ice hockey facility among whose recent alumnae are four women's Team USA Olympians.
 Larry Hart Pool: Built 1978, designed by Jeter, Cook & Jepson; a 25-meter, 8-lane, solar-heated pool, with electronic timing system and underwater windows.
 Hunt Tennis Center: Built 1995; in a terraced garden setting, with clubhouse, coaches' offices, and 22 tennis courts, six of which are all-weather USTA regulation.
 Shanahan Field: Built 2010; a complex of side-by-side artificial surface fields, in landscaping and with permanent seating and lights for night events.
 Bruce and Lueza Gelb Track: Built 2008; an 8-lane synthetic track with adjacent facilities for jumping and throwing events.
 Sylvester Boathouse: Built 1985; on Lake Quonnipaug, the crew race course.

Extracurricular activities

Athletics 

Choate competes in sports against schools from all over New England and adjacent states. Teams are fielded at the levels of varsity, junior varsity, and thirds sections. There are 32 different sports and 81 teams in interscholastic competition. Intramural programs include aerobics, dance, senior weight training, yoga, winter running, rock climbing, fitness and conditioning, and senior volleyball.

From 2007 to 2016 Choate has won New England championships in football, boys' and girls' ice hockey, girls' soccer, boys' golf, boys' crew, and in girls' swimming, volleyball, and water polo. In that same period, Choate has won Founders League championships in boys' and girls' squash, in boys' cross country, golf, softball, and tennis, and in girls' volleyball.

The athletic directors of Choate and the other members of the Eight Schools Association compose the Eight Schools Athletic Council, which organizes sports events and tournaments among ESA schools. Choate is also a member of the New England Preparatory School Athletic Council (NEPSAC) and the Founders League, which comprises private schools located mainly in Connecticut.

Fall
 Football
 Boys' soccer
 Girls' soccer
 Boys' cross country
 Girls' cross country
 Field hockey
 Girls' volleyball
 Boys' water polo

Winter
 Archery
 Boys' basketball
 Girls' basketball
 Boys' ice hockey
 Girls' ice hockey
 Boys' squash
 Girls' squash
 Boys' swimming
 Girls' swimming
 Co-ed Varsity diving
 Wrestling

Spring
 Baseball
 Softball
 Boys' tennis
 Girls' tennis
 Boys' golf
 Girls' golf
 Boys' track and field
 Girls' track and field
 Boys' crew
 Girls' crew
 Boys' lacrosse
 Girls' lacrosse
 Girls' water polo
 Boys' volleyball
 Ultimate Frisbee
 Sailing

Choate–Deerfield rivalry
Choate Rosemary Hall and Deerfield Academy have had a long-standing rivalry. The final weekend of the fall sports season is Deerfield Day (at Deerfield it's called "Choate Day"), when the two schools compete in every sport at varsity and sub-varsity levels. The tradition began in 1922 with an exchange of letters between Deerfield head Frank Boyden and Choate head George St. John. Since then, busloads (in the early years, trainloads) of students have made the 80-mile journey along the Connecticut River valley to cheer their teams on the rival's campus.

In the days leading up to the event, rallies and activities are held, led by Choate's Boar Pen cheering section and Deerfield's Captain Deerfield. At Choate there's the igniting of a fire-breathing dragon of sophisticated construction. At Deerfield there's a bonfire topped by a burning C, and ritual encircling of the school seal so that Choate teams won't tread on it. In recent years, alumni clubs of the two schools have met at venues around the world, from London to Los Angeles, to watch live-streaming of the varsity football game.

Similar boarding school traditions include the Andover–Exeter rivalry and Hotchkiss–Taft rivalry.

Historic cricket match 
The cricket match that Rosemary Hall hosted in Wallingford in 1893 against Mrs. Hazen's School of Pelham Manor, N.Y., has been described as "the first interscholastic girls sporting event in American history." (Girls intramural sports had, of course, existed, but the Rosemary cricket match is the earliest discoverable extramural item.) The dating to 1893 occurs in the official history of Choate, published in 1997. Other discussions of the event give an inferential date of 1895 or earlier, referencing newspaper articles in 1896 that imply a well-established rivalry. An 1898 wire story titled "Women and Cricket" said that the Rosemary–Hazen series was four years old. Whatever the date of the first match, journalistic treatment of the novelty was "over-publicized and mildly sensationalized", according to a standard history of American cricket published in 1998. "Bareheaded and wearing sweaters and short skirts", reported The New York Times, "daughters of some of the most prominent men in the country defied the cold, wintry wind." The Baltimore Morning Herald under the headline "Girls Play Cricket" noted that "the Pelham girls' skirts were some two or three inches longer than those of their opponents." In November 1896 the Yale Medical Journal carried a notice that Yale Med student Frederick Hulseberg had been "engaged to coach the Rosemary Hall cricket team this fall", thereby becoming the first coach of women's cricket in America.

Stengel and the Braves 
During World War II, baseball commissioner Kenesaw Mountain Landis, under orders from the Office of Defense Transportation, told major league team owners to find spring training venues close to home. In Boston, the Red Sox chose Tufts University and the Braves at first considered Phillips Academy (Andover). But a sports editor at The Boston Globe was a Choate alumnus, and he persuaded the Braves to look at Choate's Winter Exercise Building (now the Johnson Athletic Center), one of the largest glass-roofed, cage-netted rooms in the country, and easily able to accommodate a baseball infield. The Braves moved into Choate dormitories on March 21, 1943 and again in March 1944.

Their roster included Warren Spahn, Johnny Sain ("Spahn and Sain and pray for rain"), and manager Casey Stengel. The journalistic opportunity afforded by Stengel in a prep school setting was not lost, and a famous wire-service photo shows him dressed in mortarboard and gown "lecturing" his players. His nickname "The Perfessor" first appears at this time, as does a fine example of Stengelese: asked to comment on Choate's facilities, he said, "Excellent workouts in that there cage you just saw, which is a honey in all my years to the present time, if I may be permitted to drop into the vernacular."

Publications 

 The Brief, founded 1900, yearbook
 The Choate News, founded 1907, weekly newspaper; one of the oldest high school student-produced weeklies in the country
 The Lit, founded 1915, literary magazine
 The Press, established 1924, sports publication
 Choate Rosemary Hall Bulletin, founded 1939, alumni magazine
 Horizons, academic review with student essays
 High Society: A Trivial Periodical for the Serious Sort, founded 2010, social commentary periodical publishing thematic literature, art, and Op-Ed articles
 Lorem Ipsum*, satirical newspaper
 "The Currency", economics and politics magazine
SciTECH , STEM publication
Choate Public Health, health news publication
Envision Magazine, an international relations and politics magazine
Humans of Choate
"The Choate Inquiry," founded 2021, a journal of cultural and political debate.
GirlTech Magazine, dedicated to discussing women in STEM.

Gertrude Stein and The Lit 
In 1935 Gertrude Stein gave a series of talks in the United States that included, on January 12 and 13, a visit to Choate. Fortunately for literary posterity, her audience included both a stenographer and Dudley Fitts, critic, translator, and longtime teacher of Greek and Latin at Choate. Stein's public speaking style was extemporary, and Fitts recognized the permanent value of a stenographic transcript. After an exchange of letters, Stein authorized Fitts to oversee publication of her talk in The Choate Literary Magazine. On February 5, he sent her the page proofs, saying, "I had to restore a great deal of the lecture from memory. I hope I didn't spoil anything. Sorry to have missed entirely what you said about the noun." (Fitts's typescript and the Fitts-Stein correspondence are now at Yale.)

Stein's essay appeared in the February 1935 issue of The Lit with the title "How Writing Is Written." It has many times since been anthologized and given academic treatment, with the Choate text unaltered. It "occupies a unique place in Stein's corpus as a social text that carries the marks of its particular occasion ... direct address to her audience (around sixty boys, as well as faculty and some former students)." Stein's two-day stay at Choate was her first exposure to a private school, if we can believe her statement in Everybody's Autobiography (published 1937). She wrote, "It was the first time I had ever seen such a school. When I was brought up in East Oakland we all went to public school ... The boys from twelve to sixteen listened really listened [sic] to everything I had to say ... I had been much struck by the Choate school literary magazine which did have extraordinary good writing in it."

Edward Albee and The Lit 
In 1944 Edward Albee transferred from Valley Forge Military Academy to Choate, with admissions director Frank Wheeler making a prescient note, "I have a feeling he will distinguish himself in literature." His brilliance was quickly recognized and mentored by such teachers as John Joseph, Charles Rice, and Sandy Lehmann. He was made managing editor of The Lit and for two years a large part of its content, in all genres, was supplied by him. Incidents from Albee's time at Choate are reworked for his plays, including the famous "bergin and water" speech in Who's Afraid of Virginia Woolf and the "walking crow" speech in Tiny Alice, which reproduces almost verbatim English teacher Lehmann's criticism of a sonnet Albee wrote for The Lit. The May 1946 Commencement issue of The Lit contained Albee's first published play, a long one-acter called Schism. Another play written at Choate, Each In His Own Way, went unpublished and forgotten until 1996, when a classmate preparing for their 50th reunion found it in a scrapbook.

Heads of School and Foundation 

 Headmistresses of Rosemary Hall: Caroline Ruutz-Rees 1890–1938; Eugenia Baker Jessup '10, 1938–53, 1957–58; Helen MacKissick Williamson 1953–57; Alice McBee 1958–71; Elizabeth Winslow Loomis 1971–73.
 Headmasters of The Choate School: Mark Pitman 1896–1905; Sumner Blakemore 1906–08; George C. St. John 1908–47; Seymour St. John '31, 1947–73.
 Headmasters of Choate Rosemary Hall: Charles F. Dey 1973–91 (initially president and principal of The Choate School and Rosemary Hall); Edward J. Shanahan 1991–2011; Dr. Alex Curtis 2011–present.
 Presidents of The Choate School Foundation: George C. St. John 1911–47 (The Choate School, Incorporated 1911–37; The Choate School Chapel Foundation 1924–29; The Choate School Chapel and Library Foundation 1929–37; The Choate School Foundation 1937–47); Richard R. Higgins 1947–58; Donald McK. Blodget '13, 1958–61; Craig D. Munson '16, 1961–66; Daniel G. Tenney, Jr. '31, 1967–74.
 Presidents of Rosemary Hall Foundation: Caroline Ruutz-Rees 1890–1938 (headmistress and owner); Catherine B. Blanke '25, 1950–55; Franklin E. Parker, Jr. 1950–54 (chair); Elizabeth B. MacDonald '21, 1956–60; H. Chandler Turner, Jr. 1960–62; Julian M. Avery 1962–65; Gerrish H. Milliken 1965–74.
 Chairs of Choate Rosemary Hall Foundation: Elizabeth Hyde Brownell '21, 1974–77; Peter C. Goldmark, Jr. '58, 1977–79; Larry A. Hart '32, 1979–82; Bruce S. Gelb '45, 1982–85; William G. Spears '56, 1985–90; Stephen J. Schulte '56, 1990–95; Edwin A. Goodman '58, 1995–2000; Cary L. Neiman '64, 2000–05; Herbert V. Kohler, Jr. '57, 2005–10; Michael J. Carr '76, 2010–present.

Notable alumni

Notes

References

External links 
 
 
 The Association of Boarding Schools profile

 
Schools in New Haven County, Connecticut
Private high schools in Connecticut
Preparatory schools in Connecticut
Boarding schools in Connecticut
Buildings and structures in Wallingford, Connecticut
Co-educational boarding schools
Six Schools League
Educational institutions established in 1890
1890 establishments in Connecticut